Heriberto Díaz (born 5 January 1942) is a former Mexican cyclist. He competed at the 1964 Summer Olympics and the 1968 Summer Olympics.

References

External links
 

1942 births
Living people
Mexican male cyclists
Olympic cyclists of Mexico
Cyclists at the 1964 Summer Olympics
Cyclists at the 1968 Summer Olympics
Sportspeople from Jalisco
Pan American Games medalists in cycling
Pan American Games bronze medalists for Mexico
Cyclists at the 1967 Pan American Games
Medalists at the 1967 Pan American Games
20th-century Mexican people
21st-century Mexican people